Hustle Kings is a pool video game by British developer VooFoo Studios for the PlayStation 3. It was released on the PlayStation Store in Europe on 22 December 2009 and in North America on 28 January 2010. The game features a career mode as well as various trick shot and tournament modes. The game also features online play allowing the user to compete against other players over the PlayStation Network. Hustle Kings is also available for the PlayStation Vita portable gaming system.

Hustle Kings allows the user to play their external music from the PlayStation 3 hard drive during gameplay. It also utilises the PlayStation 3's implementation of the YouTube API, allowing users to record video of their gameplay and upload it to the video-sharing website from within the game. Hustle Kings has also been confirmed to support PlayStation Move as an input method. On 11 August 2014, it was announced that Hustle Kings will be coming to the PlayStation 4 in the form of a free-to-play release. On 18 March 2015, Hustle Kings released for the PlayStation 4 in Europe and in North America on 9 June 2015. A port of Hustle Kings titled 'Hustle Kings VR' was released with the PlayStation VR headset for the PlayStation 4 on 13 October.

Snooker Pack
The Hustle Kings: Snooker Pack add-on module was released 8 June 2010. The pack provided snooker as well as pool simulation, both single- and multi-player.

References

External links
 The VooFoo Studios website

2009 video games
Cue sports video games
Free-to-play video games
PlayStation Move-compatible games
PlayStation 3 games
PlayStation 4 games
PlayStation 4 Pro enhanced games
PlayStation Network games
PlayStation Vita games
PlayStation VR games

Sony Interactive Entertainment games
Video games developed in the United Kingdom
Video games with cross-platform play